Henry Scrope (ca. 1570–1625), of Greenwich, Kent, was an English politician.

He was a Member (MP) of the Parliament of England for Carlisle in 1589, 1593, 1597 and 1601.

References

1570s births
1625 deaths
People from the Royal Borough of Greenwich
English MPs 1589
English MPs 1593
English MPs 1597–1598
English MPs 1601